Di-tert-butyl ether is a  tertiary ether, primarily of theoretical interest as the simplest member of the class of di-tertiary ethers.

See also
 Ether
 Methyl tert-butyl ether
 Dimethyl ether
 Diethyl ether
 Diisopropyl ether

References

Dialkyl ethers
Ether solvents
Tert-butyl compounds
Symmetrical ethers